Star Kabab is a kebab restaurant chain located in Dhaka, Bangladesh. It has 11 branches in Dhaka. In 2015 it won the best Bangladeshi restaurant award in The Daily Star Foodiez choice awards.

Controversy
In 2016 the chain was fined 46 million taka by the VAT Intelligence Directorate for tax evasion.

See also
Madhur Canteen
Haji Biriyani

References

External links
 
 Star Kakab Menu on BD Food Blog

Bangladeshi cuisine
 
Dhaka
Restaurants in Bangladesh
Restaurants in Dhaka